Neomitranthes is a genus of plant in family Myrtaceae first described as a genus in 1977. The entire genus is endemic to Brazil.

Species

Formerly included
moved to other genera: Blepharocalyx Calyptrogenia Myrceugenia 
 Neomitranthes castellanosii - Blepharocalyx eggersii - Lesser Antilles, Guyana, Venezuela, Peru, N Brazil
 Neomitranthes ekmanii - Calyptrogenia grandiflora - Hispaniola
 Neomitranthes hatschbachii - Myrceugenia gertii   - S Brazil
 Neomitranthes maria-emiliae - Myrceugenia ovalifolia - Paraná, São Paulo

References

 
Myrtaceae genera
Endemic flora of Brazil
Taxonomy articles created by Polbot